The 2021 African Judo Championships took place in Dakar, Senegal, from 20 to 22 May 2021.

Medal summary

Men's events

Women's events

Medal table

References

External links
 

 
2021
2021 African Championships
African Judo Championships
African Judo Championships
International sports competitions hosted by Senegal
African Judo Championships